Events in the year 1136 in Norway.

Incumbents
Monarch - Harald IV Gille and Magnus IV Sigurdsson then Sigurd II Haraldsson and Inge I Haraldsson

Events
14 December – Harald IV Gille is assassinated within his sleep. Sigurd Slembe arranged for the assassination.

Deaths
14 December – Harald IV Gille of Norway, King (born c.' 1103).

References

Norway